Taizerbo is a proposed protected area of Libya. According to data of the World Database on Protected Areas (WDPA) published by the United Nations this small protected area (surface 0.3 km2) has not yet been established in 2014. The name Taizerbo is an alternative spelling of Tazirbu.

References

Protected areas of Libya